Ramante Edanthottam is a 2017 Indian Malayalam-language romantic drama film written, produced and directed by Ranjith Sankar. The film stars Kunchacko Boban and Anu Sithara in the lead roles. Filming began in February 2017 in Kochi and Vagamon. It was released in India on 12 May 2017.

Plot
The movie starts with Malini taking a video message of herself to send to Raman while driving telling him that she is coming this year to visit the Edanthottam. Unfortunately, she meets with an accident. At the hospital, her husband Elvis discovers Malini is having a love affair with Raman from her phone. The film flashbacks to a year back, when Elvis, Malini, their 10-year-old daughter and their family friend Salim and family go to Edanthottam in Vagamon to cheer up Elvis (who is a desperate producer trying to make his comeback to the movie industry).

Malini is frequently insulted and looked down upon by Elvis who in contrast is a good father but a hideous husband. There, Malini meets the owner of the Edanthottam, Raman. She becomes friends with Raman who is a widower(and his wife's name was also Malini). They spend time together talking about their life, past, future and gels up so much that at one point they get an intuition of finding the perfect match for them. Even though Malini has a bad married life, she still respects the relationship she has with her husband and daughter and keeps a friendship with Raman. On the other hand, Raman who was intensively in love with his late wife finds traces of her in Malini. He still keeps his relationship as a friend. They share their thoughts about each other's careers. Malini being a graceful dancer, Raman advises her to start a dance school. And also invites her to come to his resort next year. Malini starts a dance school with Elvis's reluctant approval which will be a success. As Elvis is a lazy, not so serious type of person who is not dedicated to his work gets huge debts which makes them change their home once in a while. Since Malini starts to earn from the dance school, she looks after the house and gets more confidence and voice in front of Elvis. Whereas Elvis is depicted as a cheating husband who goes to prostitutes while he is out of town for work.

Next year, Malini approaches Elvis about Raman's invite. Elvis agrees, but a change in schedule makes him go to Chennai. Malini quietly goes to Ethanthottam alone where she and Raman fall on the verge of love. But it is shown that they respect their personalities and decides to remain good friends. In the present day, Malini recovers and is questioned by an angry Elvis. Malini leaves the house and sends Elvis a divorce notice which shows her being an independent woman. The movie ends with Malini driving a car to drop Raman at the airport. It is shown that they are continuing with their beautiful friendship and a healthy relationship. It is also said that the divorce is approved and their daughter is living with each parent separately each month.

Cast
 Kunchacko Boban as Raman (Ram), Owner of the Edanthottam
 Anu Sithara as Malini, Elvis' wife
 Joju George as Elvis, Malini's husband
 Ramesh Pisharody as Varmaji
 Muthumani as Nasni, Malini's friend
 Sreejith Ravi as Salim
 Aju Varghese as Shathrughnan, Raman's younger brother
 Gokulan as Praneepmon
 Udaykrishna as fictional version of himself
 Jayasurya as himself

Critical response
sify rated the film 3 out of 5 stars saying that "Ramante Edanthottam is a watchable entertainer". Filmibeat reviewed the film to be " An impressive take on romance and relationships. Watch it if you are a fan of light, feel-good cinema", while rated the film 3 out of 5 stars. Lensman rated the film 3 out of 5 stars saying that " Ramante Edanthottam has a progressive attitude which makes it an enjoyable cinema even when the film has the limitations of being dramatic and predictable. With humor, conflicts and sensible conversations this two-hour long movie is never a boring experience".

Soundtrack
Music was composed by Bijibal, lyrics were written by Santhosh Varma.

 "Akale Oru Kaadinte" - Shreya Ghoshal
 "Kavitha Ezhuthunnu" - Sooraj Santhosh
 "Maavilakudil" - Rajalakshmy Abhiram

References

External links
 

2010s Malayalam-language films
Films scored by Bijibal
Indian romantic drama films
Films shot in Kochi
Films directed by Ranjith Sankar
2017 romantic drama films